Hantu Kak Limah (initially known as Hantu Kak Limah 3) is a 2018 Malaysian Malay-language horror comedy film directed by Mamat Khalid. It is a sequel to Hantu Kak Limah Balik Rumah (2010) and Husin, Mon dan Jin Pakai Toncit (2013) as well as the third and final film in Hantu Kak Limah film series. The film was released on August 9, 2018 and became a commercial success.

Plot
Husin (Awie), after looking for sustenance in Singapore, returned to the village. He later worked with his best friends Khuda (TJ Isa), Wani (Sharwani NS) and Yeh Sekupang (Rab Khalid) in a charcoal factory. Meanwhile, Kak Limah had just married Husin's friend, Khuda, and claimed to be madly in love.

However, Kak Limah was found dead in the garden. At the same time, Husin and his colleagues Wani and Khuda go into the forest but didn't know the news of Kak Limah's death and his brother, Khuda.

Meanwhile, Yeh Sekupang (Head of Information Bureau at Kampung Pisang) is managing Kak Limah's body and assigned Nayan (Ropie Cecupak) to take care of the remains. Nayan is confused with the death of Kak Limah. Meanwhile, Khuda came home to meet Kak Limah along with Husin and Wani. Ustaz Solihin then appears, who helped them confront Kak Limah's ghosts. However, Solihin's efforts failed. The five of them learn that Kak Limah's spirit had disturbed Kampung Pisang. The next day, the body of Kak Limah is buried.

Even after the funeral Yeh Sekupang is still disturbed by Kak Limah's spiritual transformation. Ustaz Solihin then wants to abolish the spirit that is still lingering in Kampung Pisang. They try five times to recapture Kak Limah's spirit, led by Ustaz Solihin. After several hours, Kak Limah's spirit was captured, but Ustaz Solihin was once again beaten by the spirit.

As a result of this commotion, the head of a herd of the elves with his entourage descended into human nature to explain what happened. The spirit was sworn into the original appearance of Nor Aini. Nor Aini is the sister of Eton who falls in love with Khuda. They were married but Khuda had breached the condition by bringing Nor Aini down to human nature without the knowledge of her father. Life in human nature is not as fancy as she lives in the elves.

Nor Aini became insane which makes Khuda hide her in the garden. Khuda cheated on his wife and married Kak Limah. This made Nor Aini so angry and revengeful which caused Kak Limah to die. The elf father warned Husin that he was not even able to marry Eton for such a thing to happen. The entourage finally brought back Nor Aini back to the base. The next day, Nor Aini, together with her three other friends, had broken her father's command and came down to human nature once again to disturb Husin, Wani, Khuda, and Yeh.

Cast

Main Cast

Awie as Husin
 Rab Khalid as Yeh Sekupang
Sharwani as Wani
TJ Isa as Khuda
 Delimawati as Kak Limah
 Zul Ariffin as Ustaz Solihin
 Uqasha Senrose as Eton/Princess Bunian

Minor Cast

 Mus May as Elf Father
 Ropie Cecupak asNayan
 Pekin Ibrahim as Musalman
 Jue Aziz as Wife Wani
 Sabri Yunus as Village Head
 Ziema Din as Maznah
 Vea Kisil as Noraini
 Erra Fazira as Wati
 Dato' Seri Vida as herself
 Amy Mastura
 Low Jing Tiong as Hantu Bang Enam
 Imuda
 Isma Zuriyya

References

External links 
 

2018 films
2018 comedy horror films
Malaysian comedy horror films
Films directed by Mamat Khalid